The Qurchi-bashi, also spelled Qorchi-bashi, was the head of the qurchis, the royal bodyguard of the Safavid shah. There were also qurch-bashis who were stationed in some of the provinces and cities. They were all, however, subordinate to the supreme qurchi-bashi, listed in this article.

List of Qurchi-bashis

Reign of Ismail I
 Abdal Beg Talish (1506-1507)
 Yakan Beg Tekkelu (1509-1510)
 Saru-Pireh Ustajlu (1512)
 Montasha Soltan Ustajlu (1513)
 Yarash Beg Ustajlu (1514)
 Ali Soltan Chichkelu (1518)

Reign of Tahmasp I
 Nadhr Beg (1524)
 Bakr Beg Ustajlu (1526-1527)
 Tatar-oghli Tekkelu (1528-1529)
 Duraq Beg Tekkelu (1529-1530)
 Dura Beg - or Dedeh Beg (1531)
 Parvaneh Beg Tekkelu (1531)
 Khalifeh Mohammad Shamlu (1533-1534)
 Ughlan Khalifeh Shamlu (1534)
 Shir Hasan (Dhu'l-Qadr?; 1534)
 Sevenduk Beg Afshar (1534-1562)
 ?
 Ahmad Beg Afshar (1574)
 Yusefqoli Soltan Afshar (1576-1577)
 Qoli Beg Afshar (1576-1577)

Reign of Ismail II
 Yusefqoli Soltan Afshar (1576-1577)
 Qoli Beg Afshar (1576-1577)
 Eskandar Beg Afshar (1577)
 Qoli Beg Afshar (1577)
 Tahmaspqoli Soltan Afshar (1577)
 Kachal Mostafa Afshar (1577)

Reign of Mohammad Khodabanda
 Esmailqoli khan (1584)

Reign of Abbas I
 Yusef Khan, son of Qoli Beg Afshar (1587-1588)
 Badr Beg Afshar (1587-1588)
 Vali Khan Afshar (1588-1589)
 Allahqoli Beg Qapameh-oghli Qajar (1591-1612)
 Isa Khan Safavi (1612-1631)

Reign of Shah Safi
 Isa Khan Safavi (1612-1631)
 Cheragh Khan Zahedi (1631-1632)
 Emir Khan Soklan Dhu'l-Qadr (1632-1638)
 Jani Beg Khan Shamlu (1638-1645)

Reign of Abbas II
 Jani Beg Khan Shamlu (1638-1645)
 Mortezaqoli Khan Begdeli Shamlu (1645-1648)
 Mortezaqoli Khan Qajar (1648-1663)

Reign of Suleiman I
 Kalb 'Ali Khan (1668-1682)
 Saru Khan Sahandlu (1682-1691)
 Shahqoli Khan Zanganeh (1691-1699)

Reign of Sultan Husayn
 Mortezaqoli Khan Bijerlu (1698-1699)
 Shahqoli Khan Zanganeh (?-1707)
 Jafarqoli Khan Hatemi (171?)
 Mohammad Zaman Khan Shamlu (1711)
 Safiqoli Khan (1715)
 Mohammadqoli Khan Shamlu (1716-1720)
 Aliqoli Khan Zanganeh (1720-1721)
 Shaykh Ali Khan Zanganeh (1721)
 Mostafaqoli Khan Sa'adlu (1721)
 Farajollah Khan Abdollu (1721)
 Mohammad Khan Abdollu (1721)

Reign of Tahmasp II
 Nader Qoli Beg (1726-1730)
 Mohammad Reza Khan Abdollu (1730-1733)

Reign of Abbas III
 Mohammad Reza Khan Abdollu (1730-1733)
 Qasem Beg Qajar (1733-1736)

Sources 
 
 
 Michael Axworthy, The Sword of Persia: Nader Shah, from Tribal Warrior to Conquering Tyrant Hardcover 348 pages (26 July 2006) Publisher: I.B. Tauris  Language: English 
 

Qurchi-bashi
Iranian military-related lists
Lists of office-holders in Iran